Jürgen Wolters (24 June 1940 – 21 November 2015) was a German econometrician specializing in time series analysis. He is a former professor of econometrics at the Free University of Berlin.

Wolters earned his diplom in mathematics from the University of Stuttgart in 1966, and later a doctorate in economics under supervision of Heinz König at the University of Mannheim.

Selected publications

References 

1940 births
2015 deaths
German economists
Time series econometricians
University of Mannheim alumni
Academic staff of the Free University of Berlin